Eternal Faith is an upcoming Chinese television series adapted from the xianxia novel Heaven Official's Blessing by Mo Xiang Tong Xiu, starring Zhai Xiaowen and Zhang Linghe.

Premise
After his third ascension to the Heavenly Realm, Xie Lian accidentally destroys some gods' properties. In order to pay for the damages, he goes back to the Mortal Realm to gain merits. During his travels, he meets a mysterious young man who goes by the name San Lang.

Cast

Main
 Zhai Xiaowen as Xie Lian
 Zhang Linghe as Hua Cheng / San Lang

Supporting
 Cai Yao as Mu Qing
 Xiao Kaizhong as Feng Xin
 Liu Jinyan as Ling Wen
 Zheng Yibin as Nan Feng
 Li Fancheng as Fu Yao
 Liu Shuai as Pei Ming
 Chang Huasen as Shi Qingxuan (Wind Master)
 Wang Yueyi as female Wind Master
 Yao Yichen as Jun Wu 
 Jin Zehao as Shi Wudu (Water Master)
 Liu Lingzi as Xuan Ji
 Ding Jiawen as Lang Qianqiu
 Gu Yuhan as Ban Yue
 Bian Tianyang as Qi Rong
 Tian Xuning as Ming Yi (Earth Master)/ He Xuan 
 Sun Jialing as female Earth Master
 Liu Zirui as Quan Yizhen
 Wang Jiayu as Yin Yu
 Zhang Zijian as Pei Su/Xiu
 Ma Li as Jian Lan

Production

Development
On December 9, 2020, it was announced that Heaven Official's Blessing would be adapted into a television series, co-produced by iQIYI, Croton Media and China Syndication

Filming
Principal photography began on July 26, 2021. Filming taking place in Datong, Shanxi wrapped up on August 16. Filming officially wrapped up in Xiangshan, Ningbo on January 15, 2022.

References

External links
 Eternal Faith on Douban

Chinese web series
Television shows based on Chinese novels
Xianxia television series
Chinese boys' love television series
Fantasy web series
Television series by iQiyi Pictures
Television series by Croton Media